Kostas Tsakonas (11 October 1943 – 4 November 2015) was a Greek actor.

His first appearance was in film and he became famous after appearing in a short length movie Kostas Zirinis. Later, he played many protagonistic roles in film, theater and in television.  He appeared in several films including Mathe pedi mou gramata, Mathe pedi mou basket, Yia mia houfta touvla, Klassiki periptosi vlavis and O fakiris.

Tsakonas died of cancer on 4 November 2015 at the age of 72.

Filmography

References

External links
 Kostas Tsakonas at cine.gr 

1943 births
2015 deaths
Greek male film actors
Greek male comedians
Male actors from Athens
Deaths from cancer in Greece